The Supermarine Spitfire is a British single-seat fighter aircraft used in the Second World War.

Spitfire may also refer to:

Transportation

Other aircraft
 Worldwide Ultralite Spitfire, ultralight aircraft
 Spitfire, the unofficial name for the Supermarine Type 224, which first flew in February 1934
 Spitfire Mark I, a helicopter
 Spitfire Mark II Tigershark, a helicopter

Road
 Triumph Spitfire, a small two-seat British sports car from Triumph Motor Company developed in the 1960s
 BSA Spitfire, a British motorcycle launched in 1966

Rail
 Spitfire, a replacement name given to a GWR 4073 Class British steam railway locomotive 5071
 "Spitfire", name allocated to steam locomotive 34066 involved in the Lewisham rail disaster of December 1957

Ships and boats
 Spitfire (catamaran), a high-performance catamaran
 Botafogo (galleon), Spitfire in Portuguese, at the time the largest ship ever built
 HMCS Spitfire, a 1855 Australian gunboat
 HMS Spitfire, the name of 10 Royal Navy ships, and one proposed one
 SS Spitfire, several ships

 USS Spitfire, the name of six U.S. Navy ships
 A type of jib sail

Comics
 Spitfire (comics), a fictional character in Marvel Comics World War II-era superteam "The Invaders"
 Spitfire (New Universe), a.k.a. Spitfire and the Troubleshooters and Codename: Spitfire, a comic book published under the New Universe imprint of Marvel Comics
 Project Spitfire, a fictional U.S. government project appearing in the Marvel Comics' series newuniversal
 Spitfire, a character from the anime/manga Air Gear

Films
 The Spitfire (1914 film), an American comedy film
 Spitfire (1922 film), an American film produced by REOL Productions
 The Spitfire (1924 film), a lost silent film
 Spitfire (1934 film), a U.S. film starring Katharine Hepburn
 Spitfire (1942 movie), the U.S. title of the 1942 British film The First of the Few 
 Spitfire, a 1995 U.S. film starring Lance Henriksen
 Spitfire (2018 film), a British documentary film

Music
 Spitfire (American band), a metalcore band from Virginia Beach, Virginia
 Spitfire (English band), a garage rock band from Crawley, West Sussex, England
 Spitfire (Russian band), a ska band from Saint Petersburg, Russia
 The Spitfire Band, a Canadian big band
 Spitfire (Jefferson Starship album), 1976 
 Spitfire (EP), a 2011 EP by Porter Robinson
 Spitfire (LeAnn Rimes album), 2013
 "Spitfire" (song), a 2004 single by the British electronic dance music group The Prodigy
 "Spitfire", a track by Public Service Broadcasting from their 2012 EP The War Room and 2013 album Inform - Educate - Entertain
 "Spitfire", a 2017 single by the Israeli musical duo Infected Mushroom
 Spitfire Audio, creators of digital sample libraries 
 Spitfire Records, a heavy metal-oriented record label

Science and technology
 Spitfire (BBS), a software program for operating a Bulletin Board System
 Spitfire sawfly, a type of insect and its caterpillar found in Australia

Sport clubs
 Kent Spitfires, the name adopted by Kent County Cricket Club when playing One Day or Twenty20 matches
 London Spitfire, an esports team in the Overwatch League
 Windsor Spitfires, a junior ice hockey team in the Ontario Hockey League
 Eastleigh F.C., a non-league football club in Hampshire, England, nicknamed "The Spitfires"

Other uses
 Spitfire (beer), a UK bottled and cask beer
 Spitfire Aerodrome, an airport in Pedricktown, New Jersey, US
 .22 Spitfire (5.7 x 33 mm), rifle cartridge
 Spitfire, a former name of the video game Serious Sam: Tormental
 A fire element Skylander from Skylanders: SuperChargers
 A character from My Little Pony: Friendship Is Magic
 The M600 Spitfire, a weapon from Titanfall and Apex Legends

See also
 Kent Spitfire (disambiguation)